Adaiyur may refer to:

India

Tamil Nadu
 Adaiyur, Salem, a village in Idappadi taluk of Salem district
 Adaiyur, Tiruvannamalai, a village in Tiruvannamalai taluk of Tiruvannamalai district
 Adaiyur, Villupuram, a village in Ulundurpet taluka of Villupuram district